Andrés Estrada Murillo (born November 12, 1967) is a Colombian football (soccer) player in midfielder role.

References

1967 births
Living people
Footballers from Cali
Colombian footballers
Association football midfielders
Colombia under-20 international footballers
Colombia international footballers
1997 Copa América players
1998 FIFA World Cup players
Deportivo Cali footballers
Atlético Nacional footballers
Atlético Bucaramanga footballers
Categoría Primera A players